Ahmed Akbar Sobhan (Shah Alam) (born on 15 February 1952) is a Bangladeshi business magnate and philanthropist. He is the founder and chairman of Bashundhara Group.  Bashundhara Group operates in various lines of activities including real estate, cement manufacturing, paper and allied products, steel products, LP Gas, and shipping.

Career
In 1987, Sobhan started the East West Property Development (Pvt) Ltd., now known as Bashundhara Housing and is part of Bashundhara Group. He also owns a number of media organizations through East West Media Group.

Sobhan is the President of Bangladesh Land Developers Association. He had served a term as the President of Bangladesh Cement Manufacturers Association.

In 2006, Sobhan sued Jugantor over two reports the newspaper had published.

On 19 April 2009, Sobhan signed a deal with Bangladesh Football Federation to provide 45 million taka to the federation in a sponsorship deal to support district level football. On 23 April 2009, he offered to build two stadiums for Bangladesh Football Federation. RAJUK was critical of the offer as the promised site was situated on protected wetlands.

On 4 March 2010, Sobhan filed a defamation suit against Prothom Alo over two reports the newspaper had published the previous year.

In June 2010, Sobhan had a confrontational meeting with Abdul Mannan Khan, state minister of housing and public works, on Detailed Area Plan by RAJUK between the minister and land developers. Following the meeting RAJUK order the demolition of a number of structures owned by Bashundhara group next week.

On 26 February 2014, Natore District correspondent of Jugantor, owned by Jamuna Group, Mahfuz Alam Moony, sued Sobhan, Imdadul Haq Milon, and Naem Nizam over reports published in newspapers owned by Bashundhara Group. According to the suit the news reports were against Moony and the distilarry of Jamuna group.

From 2005 to June 2018, Sobhan was the honorary consul of Ukraine in Bangladesh. He resigned from the post on 8 June 2018.

Sobhan personally intervened to stop Star Cineplex from leaving Bashundhara City during the COVID-19 pandemic in Bangladesh as the cineplex saw its earnings decline and faced difficulties paying rent. In 2020, he oversaw the launch of a bitumen plant by Bashundhara Oil and Gas Company, a subsidiary of Bashundhara Group.

Philanthropy

Covid-19 Pandemic
In March 2020, Sobhan proposed the conversion of four Bashundhara Group convention centres into a 5000-bed hospital for the treatment of COVID-19 patients to Bangladeshi Prime Minister Sheikh Hasina.  On May 17th 2020, the Bashundhara COVID-19 Isolation Hospital was formally inaugurated by Health and Family Welfare Minister Zahid Maleque at an event held at International Convention City Bashundhara (ICCB). 

Sobhan donated 100 million taka to the Prime Minister's office to help combat the virus outbreak in the country in April 2020.

Bashundhara Eye Hospital
In December 2013, construction of the Bashundhara Eye Hospital and Research Institute - an establishment built specifically to provide high-quality eye-care to the impoverished - was completed.   It was inaugurated by Sobhan on December 5th, 2014. As of March 2021, the hospital has served 10,500 patients free of cost and organized various eye care camps throughout the country. Furthermore, the institute runs a Shariah-based Zakat fund for Muslims alongside other religious funds.

Legal History
In October 2007, Ahmed Akbar Sobhan, his wife Afroza Begum, and their 4 sons were sentenced to 8 years of imprisonment on charges of tax evasion. During the 2006–08 Bangladeshi political crisis, Sobhan handed over the power of attorney for Bashundhara Group to a nine-member committee while he was absconding in London with his family. During the tenure of this committee, the Bashundhara Group paid more than Tk. 220 crore to the government as compensation for evading earlier taxes. This move was taken despite Sobhan's opposition and he retaliated by withdrawing the power of attorney for 4 officials of the nine-member committee. Another charge was that Sobhan and his family amassed wealth worth about Tk. 107 crore beyond their known sources of income and amassed Tk. 606.66 crore illegally while also concealing information about Tk. 14.17 crore. The charge sheet for the case mentioned that around Tk. 500 crore was whitened by the family. In December 2012, a case was filed against Sobhan, his son Sanvir, and 2 company officials for misappropriating nearly Tk. 40 crore from a businessman. The plaintiff (the chairman of a spinning mill) filed the case claiming that he was owed 3 plots from the East West Property Development Ltd. Sobhan and his son were acquitted in the case of three plots by Judge Erfan Ullah on 11 August 2014.

On 15 May 2010, assistant land officer of Shafipur union, Md Mukhlesur Rahman Khan, filled two cases against Sobhan and five others. In the cases he alleged that they accused were grabbing of government land, intimidating of government officials, and illegally lifting soil while working on Mouchak City Project of Bashundhara Group.

References

1952 births
Living people
Bangladeshi chairpersons of corporations
People convicted of tax crimes
20th-century Bengalis
People from Brahmanbaria district
21st-century Bengalis